Mikrus is a monotypic genus of East African jumping spiders containing the single species, Mikrus ugandensis. It was first described by Wanda Wesołowska in 2001, and is only found in Uganda and Kenya.

References

Monotypic Salticidae genera
Salticidae
Spiders of Africa
Taxa named by Wanda Wesołowska